Qaleh Kohneh (also Romanized as Qal’eh Kohneh and Qal‘eh-ye Kohneh) is a village in Saheb Rural District, Ziviyeh District, Saqqez County, Kurdistan Province, Iran. At the 2006 census, its population was 546, in 109 families. The village is populated by Kurds.

References 

Towns and villages in Saqqez County
Kurdish settlements in Kurdistan Province